Bright Onyebuchi Jacob is a Nigerian politician and a former chairman of Oyigbo Local Government Council. He is a member of the Rivers State People's Democratic Party, and is the current Commissioner of Commerce and Industry since December 2015.

References

Living people
Commissioners of ministries of Rivers State
People from Oyigbo
First Wike Executive Council
Rivers State Peoples Democratic Party politicians
Mayors of places in Rivers State
Year of birth missing (living people)